Chimera, Chimaera, or Chimaira (Greek for "she-goat") originally referred to:
 Chimera (mythology), a fire-breathing monster of Ancient Lycia said to combine parts from multiple animals
 Mount Chimaera, a fire-spewing region of Lycia or Cilicia typically considered the inspiration for the myth

Chimera, Chimera, chimère, Chimaira, etc. may also refer to:

Biology
 Chimaera, any of various cartilaginous fishes of the order Chimaeriformes
 Chimaera (genus), the eponymous genus of the order Chimaeriformes
 Chimera (EST), a single cDNA sequence originating from two transcripts
 Chimera (genetics), a single animal or plant with genetically distinct cells from two different zygotes
 Chimera (virus), a virus containing genetic material from other organisms
 Chimera, or fusion protein, a hybrid protein made by the splicing of two genes
 Chimera (paleontology), a fossil which was reconstructed with parts from different animals
 Chimera Project, a Soviet biological weapons program

Media

Fictional entities
 Chimera (Fullmetal Alchemist), characters in Fullmetal Alchemist
 Chimera (Marvel Comics), a Marvel Comics character
 Chimera (Dungeons & Dragons), a magical beast in Dungeons & Dragons
 Chimera Anima, a name grouping of animals in the anime Tokyo Mew Mew
 The Chimera, an alien race in Resistance

Films
 Chimera (1968 film), an Italian musicarello film
 Chimera (2001 film), an Italian romance film
 Chimère (film), a 1989 French film
 Chimères (film), a 2013 French-language film
 Chimera Strain, a 2018 Indian-American sci-fi film

Gaming
 Chimera (video game), a 1985 isometric maze arcade adventure
 Chimera (larp convention), a convention in Auckland, New Zealand
 Chimera Entertainment, a game development studio in Munich, Germany

Literature

 The Chimeras, an 1854 sequence of sonnets by Gérard de Nerval
 Chimaira, a 2001 novel by Valerio Massimo Manfredi
 Chimera (Barth novel) (1972)
 Chimera (CrossGen), a 2003 comic book mini series
 Chimaera (novel), a 2004 novel by Ian Irvine
 Chimera (novel series), a Japanese novel series by Baku Yumemakura
 Chimera (short story), a short story by Lee Youngdo
 Chimera (2015), the third novel in Mira Grant's Parasitology trilogy

Music

Groups or artists
 Chimaira, an American heavy metal band from Cleveland, Ohio
 Chimera (Irish band), a musical group
 Chimera (Russian band), an underground musical band
 Mike Dred or Chimera (born 1967), techno musician

Albums
 Chimaira (album), a 2005 album by Chimaira
 Chimera (Andromeda album) (2006)
 Chimera (Aria album) (2001)
 Chimera (Delerium album), a 2003 album by Delerium
 Chimera (EP), a 2014 EP by Marié Digby
 Chimera (Erik Friedlander album) (1995)
 Chimera (Mayhem album) (2004)
 Chimeras (album), a 2003 album by John Zorn
 Chimera, a 2002 album by The Cost
 Chimera, a 1974 album by Duncan Mackay
 Chimera, a 1983 album by Bill Nelson
 鵺-chimera-, a 2016 EP by Girugamesh

Songs
 "Chimeres I, II and III", 2007 compositions by Fred Momotenko
 "Chimera", a song by Duncan Sheik from a version of Daylight
 "Chimaera", a 1992 song by Bad Religion from Generator
 "Chimera", a 1999 song by the Tea Party from Triptych
 "Chimeras", a track by Tim Hecker from Harmony in Ultraviolet
 "Chimera", a song by Bonham from Mad Hatter
 "The Chimera", a 2012 song by the Smashing Pumpkins from Oceania
 "Chimera", a 2022 song by Polyphia featuring Lil West from Remember That You Will Die

Television
 Chimera (British TV series), a 1991 British science fiction serial
 "Chimera" (NCIS), an episode of NCIS
 "Chimera" Star Trek: Deep Space Nine), a 1999 episode of Star Trek: Deep Space Nine
 "Chimera" (Stargate SG-1), an episode of Stargate SG-1
 "Chimera" (The X-Files), an episode of The X-Files
 Chimera (South Korean TV series), a 2021 South Korean television series

People
 Jason Chimera (born 1979), NHL ice hockey forward for the Washington Capitals
 Chimaera, a ring name of Ricardo Rodriguez (wrestler) (born 1986), professional wrestler

Computing
 Chimera (software library), a peer-to-peer software research project
 Camino (web browser) or Chimera, a free Mac OS X web browser
 UCSF Chimera, a software program for visualizing molecules

Other uses
 Chimaera (town), an ancient and alternative name of Himarë, Albania
 Chimaera Mountains, an ancient and alternative name of the Ceraunian Range in Albania
 Chimera (spacecraft), a proposed spacecraft mission
 Chimera (architecture), a fantastic, mythical or grotesque decorative feature
 TVR Chimaera, a model of sports car
 Chimera (roller coaster), in La Feria Chapultepec Mágico, Mexico City

See also
 Quimera International Festival, an annual cultural festival in Metepec, Toluca, Mexico